Campbellsville High School, established in 1865, is a U.S. high school (grades 9 to 12) in the city of Campbellsville, Taylor County, Kentucky. It is one of the two high schools in Campbellsville, the other being Taylor County High School.

Athletics
Campbellsville Independent High School offers ten varsity sports for boys and girls chartered by the KHSAA.

Fall
Football 
Soccer
Volleyball
Golf
Cross-country
Winter
Swimming
Basketball
Bowling
Spring
Baseball
Softball
Track 
Tennis

Clubs and organizations
Campbellsville High School also offers several clubs such as National Beta Club, FCA, Student Council, FEA, and FCCLA

Marching band
The Campbellsville Marching Eagles is the school marching band.

Notable alumni
Max Wise (born 1975), former FBI agent serving as a member of the Kentucky Senate

References

Public high schools in Kentucky
Schools in Taylor County, Kentucky
Campbellsville, Kentucky